Al-Reem may refer to:

Al Reem Biosphere Preserve in Qatar
Al Reem Island in Abu Dhabi
Khubayb Al Reem, a preserve providing habitat for a type of deer (Al Reem)